Laht is an Estonian surname (meaning "bay" or "gulf"), with notable bearers including:

Aare Laht (born 1948), chemist
Tarmo Laht (born 1960), architect
Uno Laht (1924–2008), writer and poet
Urmas Laht (born 1955), politician

Estonian-language surnames